George Bellamy (10 July 1866 – 26 December 1944) was an English film actor of the silent era. He spent eighteen years on the stage before making his film debut in Wanted - A Husband. He appeared in 70 films between 1911 and 1933. He also directed two films in 1917. He was born in Bristol, England.

Selected filmography

 The Third String (1914)
 Called Back (1914)
 The Christian (1915)
 The Prisoner of Zenda (1915)
 Rupert of Hentzau (1915)
 Honour in Pawn (1916)
 The Mother of Dartmoor (1916)
 The Answer (1916)
 Auld Lang Syne (1917)
 The Tiger Woman (1917 - directed)
 Sweet and Twenty (1919)
 The Scarlet Wooing (1920)
 Judge Not (1920)
 Little Dorrit (1920)
 The Black Sheep (1920)
 The Woman of the Iron Bracelets (1920)
 Enchantment (1920)
 Lady Noggs (1920)
 Uncle Dick's Darling (1920)
 Moth and Rust (1921)
 The Princess of New York (1921)
 The Old Country (1921)
 The Four Just Men (1921)
 The Truants (1922)
 Was She Justified? (1922)
 A Lost Leader (1922)
 Open Country (1922)
 Not for Sale (1924)
 The Mating of Marcus (1926)
 The Valley of Ghosts (1928)
 Houp La! (1928)
 Red Aces (1930)
 Midnight (1931)
 The Officers' Mess (1931)
 Stepping Stones (1931)
 Mixed Doubles (1933)

External links

1866 births
1944 deaths
English male film actors
English male silent film actors
English film directors
Male actors from Bristol
19th-century English male actors
English male stage actors
20th-century English male actors